Hofstede is a Dutch toponymic surname. A hofstede is a farmhouse with its lands (i.e. a farm). Variant forms are Hofsté, Hofstee and Hofsteede. Notable people with the surname include:

Albert Hofstede (born 1940), American politician
Arthur ter Hofstede (born 1966), Dutch computer scientist
Bernard Hofstede (born 1980), Dutch football midfielder
Cornelis Hofstede de Groot (1863–1930), Dutch art collector, art historian and museum curator
Geert Hofstede (born 1928), Dutch organisational psychologist and anthropologist
Henk Hofstede (born 1951), Dutch pop rock singer and lyricist
Lennard Hofstede (born 1994), Dutch racing cyclist
Peter Hofstede (born 1967), Dutch football striker
Peter Hofstee (born 1962), Dutch physicist and computer scientist
Petrus Hofstede de Groot (1802–1886), Dutch theologian
Tim Hofstede (born 1989), Dutch football defender

References

Dutch-language surnames
Dutch toponymic surnames

de:Hofstede
fr:Hofstede
nl:Hofstede